Wilhelm August Ferdinand Ekengren  (10 November 1861 – 26 November 1920) was a Swedish diplomat. He was envoy of Sweden to the United States from 1912 to 1920.

Career
Ekengren was born in Stockholm, Sweden to Vilhelm Ferdinand Ekengren (1835-1923) and his wife Augusta Bachertz. Ekengren graduated from Uppsala University in 1895 and began his diplomatic career in 1896. He was vice consul in Rouen in 1896, which was followed by appointments as vice consul in Bordeaux and vice consul Le Havre and consul in Lübeck.

Ekengren was vice consul in New York City from 1899 to 1900 and from 1902 to 1903. He was second secretary at the Ministry for Foreign Affairs in 1905 and legation secretary in Washington, D.C. in 1906 (thereunder serving longer periods as chargé d'affaires). He became legation counsellor there in 1910 and was envoy from March 1912. During World War I when diplomatic relations with the Austro-Hungarian Empire were severed, he was in charge of relations between Austria-Hungary and the United States.

Personal life
In 1909 he married Laura Wolcott Jackson. He died on 26 November 1920 in Washington, D.C. after a brief illness. Funeral services was held at St. John's Episcopal Church in Washington, D.C. Ekengren's remains were then brought to Sweden on the American battleship  which arrived in Stockholm on 15 February 1921. He was buried at Norra begravningsplatsen in Solna Municipality.

Dates of appointment
Ekengren's dates of appointment:
Acting Vice Consul in Rouen; 22 August – 23 November 1896
Acting Vice Consul in Bordeaux; 17 August 1897 – 1 June 1898
Acting Vice Consul and Consulate Secretary in Le Havre; 2 July – 21 December 1898
Acting Vice Consul in New York City; 21 March 1899 – 9 October 1900
Acting Consul General in Lübeck; 1 June – 1 August. 1902
Acting Vice Consul in New York City; 10 September 1902 – 3 March 1903
Serving at the Foreign Office in Stockholm; 2 October 1903
Acting Second Secretary; 6 December 1904
Second Secretary; 30 June 1905
Acting head of the Consulate Department; 4 December – 31 December 1905, 5 August – 31 August 1906
Legation Secretary in Washington, D.C.; 28 September 1906
Acting Charge d'affaires; 1 December 1906 – 23 April 1907, 29 October 1907 – 15 September 1908, 16 June – 29 November 1909, 7 June 1910 – 23 January 1911
Legation Counsellor; 16 December 1910
Envoy in Washington, D.C.; 22 March 1912.

Awards and decorations
Commander First Class of the Order of the Polar Star
Second Class of the Order of the Double Dragon
Officer of the Order of Leopold

References

1861 births
1920 deaths
People from Stockholm
Ambassadors of Sweden to the United States
Uppsala University alumni
Burials at Norra begravningsplatsen
Commanders First Class of the Order of the Polar Star